Saronno–Como railway is a railway line in Lombardy, Italy.

It is one of the three continuations of the Milan-Saronno railway.

History 
The line was opened by the FNM on 1 June 1898 between Saronno and Grandate; the last part, from Grandate to Como Lago, had already been opened on 24 September 1885 as part of the demolished Como–Varese railway.

See also 
 List of railway lines in Italy

References 

 Ferrovienord - Prospetto informativo della rete

External links 

Railway lines in Lombardy
Railway lines opened in 1898
1898 establishments in Italy